Antonio Quintavalle (1688 – c.1724) was an Italian opera composer.

Biography 
Quintavalle was born into the family that belonged to Venetian nobility. By 1703 and perhaps earlier he was chamber organist at the Mantuan court. He wrote music for three operas while he was in Mantua, one in collaboration with the maestro di cappella Antonio Caldara. In 1712 he became maestro di cappella of Trent Cathedral. His fourth and last opera was produced in Trent. The exact year of his death is uncertain. There is evidence suggesting that Quintavalle was in Trent until at least 1724. However, there is also record of death for an Antonio Quintavalle, chaplain at Torcello, who died near Venice on 28 January 1721 at the age of 45. It is possible that this other Antonio Quintavalle may be the composer or a different person entirely. None of Quintavalle's works have survived to today.

Works

Operas
L'oracolo in sogno (1699) (with Antonio Caldara, Antonio Pollarolo) 
Il trionfo d'amore (1703) 
Paride sull'Ida, ovvero Gli amori di Paride con Enone (1704) 
Partenope (1713)

Oratorios
Jefte (1688) 
Sacri amoris triumphus in conversione S Augustini Hipponensis Episcopi (1694)
Il sacrificio di Jefte (1702)

Sources
The New Grove Dictionary of Opera, edited by Stanley Sadie (1992),   and 

Italian classical composers
Italian male classical composers
Italian opera composers
Male opera composers
1684 births
1724 deaths
17th-century Italian composers
18th-century Italian composers
18th-century Italian male musicians
17th-century male musicians